Count József Teleki de Szék (24 October 1790 – 15 February 1855) was a Hungarian jurist and historian, who served as the first President of the Hungarian Academy of Sciences from 1830 until his death.

He was born into an old noble Calvinist family. He functioned as Governor of Transylvania between 1842 and 1848.

Ancestry

References
 Szinnyei, József: Magyar írók élete és munkái XIII. (Steiner–Télfy). Budapest: Hornyánszky. 1909.
 Nagy Ferenc: Teleki József gróf. In: Nemzeti évfordulóink 2005. Bp.: Nemzeti Kulturális Örökség Minisztériuma, 2004

1790 births
1855 deaths
19th-century Hungarian historians
Hungarian nobility
Hungarian Calvinist and Reformed Christians
Jozsef
Members of the Hungarian Academy of Sciences